Bohdan-Ivan Volodymyrovych Horodyskyi or Bohdan-Ivan Horodyskyy (born 18 May 1994) is a Ukrainian long-distance runner. In 2020, he competed in the men's race at the 2020 World Athletics Half Marathon Championships held in Gdynia, Poland.

In 2019, he competed in the men's event at the 2019 European 10,000m Cup held in London, United Kingdom.

In 2021, he competed in the men's marathon at the 2020 Summer Olympics held in Tokyo, Japan.

References

External links 
 

Living people
1994 births
Place of birth missing (living people)
Ukrainian male middle-distance runners
Ukrainian male long-distance runners
Ukrainian male marathon runners
Olympic athletes of Ukraine
Olympic male marathon runners
Athletes (track and field) at the 2020 Summer Olympics